John Thomas Fraser (May 28, 1882 – April 22, 1942) was a Canadian professional ice hockey winger. He played with the Renfrew Creamery Kings of the National Hockey Association in the 1909–10 season.

References

External links
Jack Fraser at JustSportsStats

1882 births
1942 deaths
Ice hockey people from Ontario
People from Renfrew County
Renfrew Hockey Club players
Canadian ice hockey left wingers